James Osborne Putnam (July 4, 1818 Attica, then in Genesee Co., now in Wyoming County, New York – April 24, 1903 Buffalo, Erie County, New York) was an American lawyer and politician from New York.

Life
He was the son of Congressman Harvey Putnam (1793–1855) and Myra (Osborne) Putnam (1795–1863). He graduated from Yale College in 1839. Then he studied law, was admitted to the bar, and commenced practice in Buffalo. On January 5, 1842, he married Harriet Foster Palmer (died 1853), and they had four children.

He was a member of the New York State Senate (31st D.) in 1854 and 1855. On March 15, 1855, he married Kate F. Wright (1835–1895), and they had three sons.

At the 1857 New York state election, he ran on the American party ticket for Secretary of State of New York, but was defeated by Democrat Gideon J. Tucker.

He was a presidential elector in 1860, voting for Abraham Lincoln and Hannibal Hamlin.

He was U.S. Minister to Belgium from 1880 to 1882.

He was Chancellor of the University of Buffalo from 1895 to 1902.

He was buried at the Forest Lawn Cemetery, Buffalo.

Sources
The New York Civil List compiled by Franklin Benjamin Hough (pg. 137 and 144; Weed, Parsons and Co., 1858)
The New York Civil List (pg. 546; Weed, Parsons and Co., 1865)
DEATH LIST OF A DAY; James O. Putnam in NYT on April 25, 1903
Putnam genealogy at Family Tree Maker

External links

1818 births
1903 deaths
Ambassadors of the United States to Belgium
New York (state) state senators
Politicians from Buffalo, New York
New York (state) Whigs
19th-century American politicians
New York (state) Know Nothings
New York (state) Republicans
Yale College alumni
People from Attica, New York
Leaders of the University at Buffalo
Burials at Forest Lawn Cemetery (Buffalo)
19th-century American diplomats
Lawyers from Buffalo, New York
1860 United States presidential electors